Maurizio Sacconi (Conegliano, 13 July 1950) is an Italian politician from Veneto.
A long-time member of the Italian Socialist Party, from 1979 to 1994 he was a member of the Italian Chamber of Deputies and from 1987 to 1994 he served also as Under-Secretary of the Treasury. Between 1981 and 1984 he was the first president of Legambiente, the largest environmentalist association in Italy. From 1995 to 2001 he was branch office director of the International Labour Organization.

In 2001 Sacconi joined Forza Italia and was appointed Under-Secretary of Labour in Silvio Berlusconi's governments. After five years in office as deputy of Minister Roberto Maroni, he was elected senator in 2006 and re-elected in 2008.

He served as Minister of Labour and Social Security in Berlusconi IV Cabinet (2009–2011) .

References

1950 births
Living people
People from the Province of Treviso
Italian Socialist Party politicians
Forza Italia politicians
The People of Freedom politicians
New Centre-Right politicians
Italian Ministers of Labour
Deputies of Legislature VIII of Italy
Deputies of Legislature IX of Italy
Deputies of Legislature X of Italy
Deputies of Legislature XI of Italy
Senators of Legislature XV of Italy
Senators of Legislature XVI of Italy
Politicians of Veneto